Kaithal railway station is located in Kaithal district in the Indian state of  Haryana and serves  Kaithal.

The railway station
It was allotted the railway code of KLE under the jurisdiction of Delhi railway division.

References

Railway stations in Kaithal district